Chandra Prakash Vohra is an Indian geologist, glaciologist and mountaineer who climbed Mount Everest, the highest peak in the world, in 1965. He was one of the 9 summiters  of the first successful Indian Everest Expeditions that climbed Mount Everest in May 1965 led by  Captain M S Kohli.On May 24 th 1965  Vohra and Ang Kami Sherpa together reached the top of Mount Everest,. He was the first Indian civilian to scale the peak a feat he accomplished on 24 May 1965. A winner of the Arjuna Award (1965), and the National Mineral Award, Vohra was honoured by the Government of India in 1965, with the award of Padma Shri, the fourth highest Indian civilian award,. He is the fourth Indian man and nineteenth man in world that climbed Mount Everest.

Biography
Chandra Prakash Singh Vohra did his schooling in Jammu and Kashmir and started his career with the Geological Survey of India (GSI). He spent his entire career with GSI becoming the first   director of the Division for Snow, Ice and Glacier Studies and retired in 1994 as its Director General. A geologist by profession, he carried out several geological expeditions and is known to have visited many glaciers around the world. He participated in three Everest expeditions and summitted the peak in 1965, becoming the first Indian civilian achieve the feat. In 1973, he was part of a team that explored Antarctica and was successful in camping at the southern tip of the continent. He was the leader of the landing group of the First Indian Expedition to Antarctica in 1981.

Honors and awards 
Vohra is a recipient of the National Mineral Award of the Ministry of Mines (India). The Government of India awarded him the civilian honour of Padma Shri in 1965 and he received the Arjuna Award, the second highest Indian sports award from the Sports Authority of India the same year. In 1996, in the golden jubilee year of Indian independence, Vohra was officially included in the list of the most outstanding geoscientists of Independent India. The Indian Mountaineering Foundation awarded him their Nain Singh-Kishen Singh Lifetime Achievement Award in 2010.

Chandra Prakash Vohra, post retirement from government service, is settled in Chandigarh, with his wife Satinder Vohra.

See also

 Mountaineering in India
Indian summiters of Mount Everest - Year wise
List of Mount Everest summiters by number of times to the summit
List of Mount Everest records of India
List of Mount Everest records
 Geological Survey of India

References

Indian summiters of Mount Everest
Indian mountain climbers
Recipients of the Padma Shri in sports
Recipients of the Arjuna Award
Indian geologists
Mountain climbers from Jammu and Kashmir
Indian glaciologists
Date of birth missing
20th-century Indian earth scientists
Scientists from Jammu and Kashmir